Armando Enríquez Flores (born 2 May 1963) is a Mexican politician affiliated with the National Action Party. As of 2014 he served as Deputy of the LVIII and LX Legislatures of the Mexican Congress representing the State of Mexico. He also was municipal president of Toluca from 2003 to 2006.

References

1963 births
Living people
Politicians from Durango
People from Durango City
Municipal presidents in the State of Mexico
National Action Party (Mexico) politicians
Mexican architects
20th-century Mexican politicians
21st-century Mexican politicians
National Autonomous University of Mexico alumni
Members of the Congress of the State of Mexico
Deputies of the LX Legislature of Mexico
Members of the Chamber of Deputies (Mexico) for the State of Mexico